Matt Regan was one of the original team that launched UK multiformat videogame magazine Mean Machines. He and Julian Rignall started off as the two main reviewers.

According to the first issues' editorial, he was a keen Amiga player before joining the magazine and being "converted" to consoles. However his heart wasn't really in it and after a few issues it was obvious he couldn't get excited about consoles. Many of Matt's review comments were actually penned by Richard Leadbetter as Gary Harrod didn't have time to create Rich in cartoon form until issue 9.

He left in issue 9. He reappeared in fellow EMAP publications Sinclair User and PC Leisure, then joined PC Format magazine.

External links 
 Matt Regan's Biography at the Mean Machines Archive

British male journalists
Living people
Year of birth missing (living people)